NABC is an initialism that may refer to any of the following:

North American Bridge Championships, North American contract bridge tournaments
National Association of Basketball Coaches, an American trade association of men's college basketball coaches
Native American Bible College, an American bible college located in Shannon, North Carolina
North American Boxing Council, a North American sanctioning body for boxing
North American Baptist Conference, a North American association of Baptist Congregations of German ethnic heritage.
North American Bengali Conference, a Bengali cultural organisation
New Albanian Brewing Company, an American microbrewery located in New Albany, Indiana